Henley Bridge is a road bridge built in 1786 at Henley-on-Thames over the River Thames, between Oxfordshire and Berkshire. The bridge has five elliptical stone arches, and links Hart Street in Henley with White Hill (designated the A4130) leading up a steep hill to Remenham Hill. It crosses the Thames on the reach between Hambleden Lock and Marsh Lock, carrying the Thames Path across the river. It is a Grade I listed building.

History
This point of the Thames has been used for crossing since ancient times. The current bridge replaced an earlier wooden structure, the foundations of which can be seen in the basement of the Henley Royal Regatta headquarters nearby on the Berkshire side. However, the remains of two stone arches on both sides of the river indicate the existence of an even more ancient stone bridge prior to the timber structure. This bridge has been identified by some authors as the bridge which the Romans crossed pursuing the Britons in 43AD, as described by Dion Cassius. This hypothesis is refuted by many other authors. The earliest recording of a bridge is in the Patent Rolls of 1232. In 1354, two granaries were leased on the bridge, which was timber on stone piers and several chapels are recorded. It was carried away in the great flood of 1774, but part of the eastern abutment is built on the intact easternmost span of the original 12th-century bridge.

Present bridge

It was originally designed in 1781 by William Hayward of Shrewsbury, who died in 1782 before the construction of the bridge had begun. The bridge was built by the Oxford mason John Townesend.
Sculptures of Isis and Tamesis by Anne Seymour Damer are at the keystone of the central arch on each side of the bridge. Tamesis faces the north (downstream section of the bridge) and Isis the south (upstream section). The original models for these can be seen in the Henley Gallery at the nearby River and Rowing Museum.

The cost of building the bridge was approximately £10,000.

Damage and repair in 2010 and 2011

In August 2010 the bridge was damaged by a boat named Crazy Love. A £200,000 repair programme commenced the following year

Battle of the bridge lights

Strings of white LED bulbs were attached to the Grade I listed crossing in March 2018 by artist Clive Hemsley. This was done without permission from the district and county councils and the artist was instructed to remove the lights. He claimed to have received scores of messages of support from people wanting the lights to remain permanently, including one from the Mayor of Henley.

The artist subsequently applied for planning permission, which was refused. The District Council conservation team stated: "As previously advised, the conservation team maintain concerns that this proposal is not appropriate to the special historic and architectural interest of the listed building and fails to recognise the reasons for its listing at such a high grade. It would similarly pose an alteration to its setting which would not serve to enhance its interest or that of its setting, the Henley Conservation Area. The scheme remains insufficiently justified and is unlikely to be able to be able to demonstrate a sufficient level of public benefits to overcome harm to such a significant building."

Adjacent features
Leander Club, one of the oldest rowing clubs in the world, is also close to the bridge on the Berkshire side. On the Oxfordshire (Henley) side are the Angel on the Bridge riverside public house and the Red Lion Hotel, an old coaching inn. St Mary the Virgin, the main civic church in Henley with its tower dominating the view, is also close by.

See also

 Crossings of the River Thames

References

Bibliography

External links 

 Keystones: & — photographs from the Courtauld Institute of Art
Where Thames smooth waters glide.

Bridges in Oxfordshire
Bridges across the River Thames
Grade I listed bridges
Grade I listed buildings in Oxfordshire
Bridge
Grade I listed buildings in Berkshire
Road bridges in England
Bridges completed in 1786
Remenham